Gua Lowo is a cave which is located at Watuagung, Watulimo sub-district of Trenggalek Regency, East Java in Indonesia. Gua Lowo is Indonesian word, which means bat's cave. There are no other fauna except bats in this cave. The cave is about 5 kilometers long, though only 859 meters of the cave is accessible. Based on statements from cave experts, Mr. Gilbert Manthovani and Dr. Robert K Kho in 1984, Gua Lowo is the longest natural cave in Southeast Asia.

This cave is located in the hills of Karts, which was discovered by 1931 by a resident named Lomedjo. In 1983 it was declared as a tourist destination.

References 

Archaeological sites in Indonesia
Caves of Indonesia
Cultural Properties of Indonesia in East Java
Geography of East Java
Tourist attractions in East Java